Przylesie  is a village in the administrative district of Gmina Olszanka, within Brzeg County, Opole Voivodeship, in south-western Poland.

The village has a population of 800.

References

Przylesie